The Guardia Mora (Moorish Guard), officially the Guardia de Su Excelencia el Generalísimo (En: The Guards of His Excellency the Generalissmo) was Francisco Franco's personal ceremonial escort. It was formed in February 1937 from personnel drawn from the Guardia Civil in Tétouan and the II Tabor of Grupo de Regulares de Tetuan No.1. Their white and red hooded cloak, based on the djellaba, was worn over the white parade uniform of Regulares officers.

The Guardia Mora was not controlled by the Spanish military but by the Casa Militar de Su Excelencia el Generalísimo y Jefe del Estado, the Military House of His Excellency the Generalissimo and Head of State.

History
The Guardia Mora has its origins in the early stages of the Spanish Civil War. In July 1936 as Military Commander of the Canary Islands, General Francisco Franco managed to fly to Spanish Morocco, where he took control of the Spanish Army of Africa, consisting mainly of Moroccan Regulares and Spanish Legion units. These professional troops were transported to Spain and began to advance towards Madrid. Already in October 1936, when he was appointed head of state during an official ceremony in Burgos, Franco attended the event accompanied by an escort formed by Moroccan horsemen from the existing Regulares cavalry regiments. Thereafter, Franco began attending public events flanked by a large escort of Moroccan cavalry in "Moorish" ceremonial uniforms and carrying lances
 
The British historian Paul Preston has pointed out that the Guardia Mora became a symbol in itself and the best example of the new power that was being built around the figure of Franco.

After the end of the Civil War, the Moroccan units of the Army of Africa were either disbanded or returned to continue serving in Spanish Morocco. However a selected cavalry unit remained on the peninsula, as mounted guards, performing escort and other ceremonial functions and providing protection for the Head of State. When Franco moved his official residence to Madrid, the Guardia Mora followed him, and once established in the capital they came to have a permanent quartering in the Palace of El Pardo, official residence of the "generalissimo."

The Guardia Mora was dissolved in 1956, after the incorporation of Spanish Morocco into the newly independent Kingdom of Morocco The mounted Guard itself continued to serve with Spanish personnel only, under the title of "Guardia de Franco". Upon Franco’s death and the ascension of King Juan Carlos I as the head of state, the guard regiment formed the basis of the "Regiment of the Royal Guard" (Regimiento de la Guardia Real); the modern day Guardia Real.

See also

 Spanish Royal Guard
 Spanish Army
 Army of Africa (Spain)
 Francoist Spain

Notes

External links
 Franco y su fiel Guardia Mora Spanish only

Spanish ceremonial units
Military history of Spain
Military units and formations of Spain
Military units and formations of the Spanish Civil War
Spanish Army
Military history of Morocco
Military units and formations established in 1937
Military units and formations disestablished in 1956